Peter Marshall may refer to:

Entertainment
 Peter Marshall (entertainer) (born 1926), American game show host of The Hollywood Squares, 1966–1981
 Peter Marshall (author, born 1939) (1939–1972), British novelist whose works include The Raging Moon and Excluded from the Cemetery
 Peter Marshall (author) (born 1946), British travel writer whose works include Demanding the Impossible: A History of Anarchism and Europe's Lost Civilization
 Peter Marshall (UK broadcaster) (born 1945), British game show host of Sale of the Century in the 1980s

Sports
 Peter Marshall (cricketer) (born 1963), New Zealand cricketer
 Peter Marshall (footballer, born 1942), Australian footballer for Collingwood in the 1960s
 Peter Marshall (footballer, born 1954), Australian footballer for Collingwood in the 1970s
 Peter Marshall (squash player) (born 1971), English squash player
 Peter Marshall (swimmer) (born 1982), American swimmer

Other
 Peter Marshall (Presbyterian minister) (1902–1949), Scottish-born American Presbyterian pastor, chaplain of the United States Senate
 Peter Marshall (Anglican priest) (1940–2020), Anglican Dean of Worcester
 Peter Marshall (journalist) (born 1952), British journalist and broadcaster BBC Newsnight
 Peter Marshall (police officer) (born c. 1953), commissioner of New Zealand and the Solomon Islands police services
 Peter Marshall (historian) (born 1964), history professor at Warwick University
 Peter Marshall (diplomat), British diplomat and Commonwealth Deputy Secretary-General (1983–88)
 Peter Paul Marshall (1830–1900), Scottish civil engineer, painter, and partner in Morris, Marshall, Faulkner & Co.
 P. J. Marshall (Peter James Marshall, born 1933), history professor at King's College London